Below is a list of SEC Men's Basketball Champions and Award Winners.

Champions and Award Winners
Official SEC champions in bold.

Regular season championships by school

†Former member of the SEC

Tournament championships by school

†Former member of the SEC
Kentucky defeated Georgia in the 1988 SEC Tournament final, but the tournament title was vacated later because of NCAA violations.

Player of the year award winners by school

†Multiple players of the year awarded that season.

References

Champions